Inna Zlidnis (born 18 April 1990) is an Estonian football player who plays for Ferencváros and the Estonia women's national football team, as a left back.

References

External links

1990 births
Living people
Estonian women's footballers
Estonian expatriate footballers
Estonian expatriate sportspeople in Germany
Estonian expatriate sportspeople in Hungary
Estonia women's international footballers
Expatriate women's footballers in Germany
Expatriate women's footballers in Hungary
Women's association football defenders
Ferencvárosi TC (women) footballers
FC Levadia Tallinn (women) players